Paskouh Rural District is a rural district (dehestan) in balouchestan in khash district and saravan (makkoran), Iran. At the 2006 census, its population was 6,407, in 1,592 families.  The rural district has 15 villages.

References 

Rural Districts of South Khorasan Province
Qaen County